Arnold Viersen  (born May 3, 1986) is a Canadian politician who was elected to represent the riding of Peace River—Westlock in the 2015 Canadian federal election.

Background 
Viersen attended Covenant Canadian Reformed School in Neerlandia from Grade 1 through Grade 12, and currently resides near his childhood home on an acreage in Westlock County. Before entering politics, Viersen worked as a journeyman auto mechanic. He identifies as a social conservative.

Career 
In the 42nd Canadian Parliament, Viersen served on the Indigenous and Northern Affairs Committee, and was named the Official Opposition's Deputy Critic of Rural Affairs. On December 8, 2016, Viersen's Private Member's Motion (M-47) received unanimous consent in the House of Commons. The official text of this motion reads: 
"That the Standing Committee on Health be instructed to examine the public health effects of the ease of access and viewing of online violent and degrading sexually explicit material on children, women and men, recognizing and respecting the provincial and territorial jurisdictions in this regard, and that the said Committee report its findings to the House no later than July 2017." The Health Committee's ensuing study was the first Government of Canada study into the public health effects of pornography since 1985.

On February 4, 2020, during a debate on safety in sex work, Viersen asked New Democratic Party MP Laurel Collins if she had ever considered sex work. Collins was criticizing Bill 36 changes enacted by former Prime Minister Stephen Harper's Conservative government that Collins suggested put sex workers at risk. Viersen's question sparked immediate heckling and a shout of "shame on you" from other members of Parliament. Viersen apologized following the reaction, both in the House and on Twitter.

In June 2022, after the Supreme Court of the United States decision in Dobbs v. Jackson Women's Health Organization overturned abortion rights from Roe v. Wade, Viersen celebrated the ruling on Facebook, calling abortion in Canada the "greatest human rights tragedy of our time."

Electoral record

References

External links

1986 births
Living people
Members of the House of Commons of Canada from Alberta
Mechanics (people)
Conservative Party of Canada MPs
People from Barrhead, Alberta
21st-century Canadian politicians